The Nandi Awards are presented annually in Andhra Pradesh, For Telugu cinema by State government. "Nandi" means "bull", the awards being named after the big granite bull at Lepakshi — a cultural and historical symbol of Andhra Pradesh. Nandi Awards are presented in four categories: Gold, Silver, Bronze, and Copper.

The Nandi awards for the year 1998 were Presented on 18 March 1999 at Lalitha Kala Thoranam, Hyderabad.

1998 Nandi Awards Winners List

References 

1998
1998 Indian film awards